Sasmit Patra is an Indian politician and a member of the Biju Janata Dal. Since 28 June 2019, he is the member of the Parliament of India representing Odisha in the Rajya Sabha, the upper house and appointed  chief whip of the party. He is currently Spokesperson of Biju Janata Dal . He is a Christian. His father was Swarupananda Patra, the former president of the Odisha Minority Forum (OMF)..He has been renominated to the  Rajya Sabha by Biju Janata Dal for the second time in May 2022.

About
• Member of Parliament (Rajya Sabha)
• Member of Vice-Chairmen Panel of Rajya Sabha
• Member, Parliamentary Departmental Standing Committee on Human Resource Development which covers the Ministry of HRD, Women and Child Development, Skill Development and Entrepreneurship, and Sports and Youth Affairs
• Member, Parliamentary Joint Committee on Office of Profit
• Distinguished Professor, Management Development Institute, Gurgaon 
• National Spokesperson and Media Coordinator, Biju Janata Dal
• Secretary and Member of State Council of Biju Janata Dal as well as Member of the BJD’s IT Wing Core Committee.
Dr. Patra has a rich experience of academia as well as public policy and governance. An academic by profession, he has taught courses in the areas of organisational behaviour and human resource management. He also has experience of working in industry.

Dr. Patra has wide-ranging experience of working across all four pillars of democracy – legislature, executive, judiciary and media. As Vice-Chairman of the Rajya Sabha, he brings with him deep knowledge of legislative practices. Having worked closely with the Odisha government, he has wide experience of working with the executive branch as well. Trained as a lawyer, he is also putting up a pro bono law practice. As media coordinator of the Biju Janata Dal, he has handled the IT and digital platforms for his party.

Education and career 
Education –B.A.(Hons.)
Ph.D. (Business Management)
MBA (specialization in HR)
LLB (Law Graduate)
Educated at Utkal University, Bhubaneswar and Allahabad Agricultural Institute (Deemed University), Allahabad (Uttar Pradesh)

Work experience
Work Experience – 17 Years of work experience in academics, business research, industry and corporate sector, UNDP-Government of Odisha project apart from political work and social work. He was the Dean of XAVIER-EMLYON Business School, the first Indo-French business school in India, a joint collaboration between Xavier University, Bhubaneswar and Emlyon Business School, France.

References 

Odisha politicians
Sam Higginbottom University of Agriculture, Technology and Sciences alumni
Biju Janata Dal politicians
Rajya Sabha members from Odisha
Year of birth missing (living people)
Living people

About